Simon Lekressner (born September 1, 1998) is an American soccer player who plays as a defender.

Career

College & Amateur
Lekressner played four years of college soccer at the University of California, Berkeley between 2016 and 2019. He made 65 appearances, scoring 8 goals and tallying 5 assists for the Golden Bears.

While at college, Lekressener spent time in the USL League Two with Washington Crossfire,  San Francisco City and San Francisco Glens.

New England Revolution II
Lekressner was drafted 30th overall in the 2020 MLS SuperDraft by the New England Revolution. Lekressner signed with the Revolution's USL League One affiliate New England Revolution II prior to the 2020 season. He made his league debut for the club on July 25, 2020, against Union Omaha. His contract option was declined by New England on November 30, 2020.

References

External links
Simon Lekressner at University of California-Berkeley Athletics

1998 births
Living people
American soccer players
Association football defenders
California Golden Bears men's soccer players
New England Revolution II players
San Francisco City FC players
San Francisco Glens players
Soccer players from Washington (state)
Sportspeople from Bellevue, Washington
USL League One players
USL League Two players